is a JR East railway station on the Hanawa Line in the city of Hachimantai, Iwate Prefecture, Japan.

Lines

Station layout
Tayama Station consists of a single ground-level side platform serving a single bi-directional track. The station is unattended.

History
Tayama Station opened on October 25, 1929, serving the village of Tayama. The station was absorbed into the JR East network upon the privatization of JNR on April 1, 1987.

Surrounding area
  National Route 282
Tayama Post Office
Tayama Ski Resort
Tayama Onsen

See also
 List of Railway Stations in Japan

References

External links

  

Hanawa Line
Railway stations in Japan opened in 1929
Railway stations in Iwate Prefecture
Stations of East Japan Railway Company
Hachimantai, Iwate